Steven C. Miller is an American screenwriter, editor, and director. His feature film debut, Automaton Transfusion, became an instant cult classic and catapulted his career into Hollywood. He directed the remake of Silent Night, Deadly Night in 2012 and then shifted from horror to action. He has directed films starring notable actors such as Bruce Willis, Sylvester Stallone, Nicolas Cage, John Cusack, Aaron Eckhart, Giancarlo Esposito, and Dave Bautista.

Education 
Miller attended Full Sail University where he majored in film and television production.

Career
His feature film debut, Automaton Transfusion (2006), was made for under $15,000; it was purchased and released worldwide by Dimension Films after premiering at the 2007 Screamfest Horror Film Festival. After signing with Aperture Entertainment and United Talent Agency, Miller was attached to direct several studio films, including a cancelled MGM remake of Motel Hell (1980).

In 2011, Miller embarked on directing three more independent features. The first was the thriller The Aggression Scale (2012), described by IndieWire as "Home Alone with more death". After premiering at South by Southwest, the film was purchased by Anchor Bay Entertainment for worldwide distribution. His second project was Under the Bed (2012), referred to by JoBlo.com as "a blood-soaked horror extravaganza"; the film premiered at Fantasia Festival and was acquired for release by XLrator Media. Miller's next film was the Christmas slasher film Silent Night (2012), a remake of Silent Night, Deadly Night (1984). Fearnet stated "this straightforward and scrappy little remake is somehow more entertaining than half of what passes for 'wide release' horror movies these days." Silent Night, like The Aggression Scale, was released by Anchor Bay.

Miller made a shift to mainstream filmmaking with four films produced by Emmett/Furla/Oasis and released by Lionsgate Premiere: Extraction (2015), Marauders (2016), Arsenal (2017) and First Kill (2017). Miller had his fifth collaboration with EFO and Lionsgate through the sequel Escape Plan 2: Hades (2018). Escape Plan 2 star Slyvester Stallone stated that this film was the "most horribly produced film I have ever had the misfortune to be in" of his career.Through these titles, Miller has collaborated several times with (in addition to Willis) Dave Bautista, Adrian Grenier and Johnathan Schaech.

Miller's latest project, action-thriller Live, began production in Birmingham, Alabama in May 2018. The film will star Aaron Eckhart as a disgraced police officer seeking an escaped kidnapee after killing her abductor. Courtney Eaton will co-star as an online reporter filming the chase in real time.

Filmography 

Other credits
 H. G. Wells' War of the Worlds (2005) – art department: second unit; direct-to-video
 Penance (2009) – special thanks
 Pernicious (2014) – thanks

Music videos
Miller has directed music videos for the bands Blinded Black and Tokyo Rose.

References

External links 

1981 births
Action film directors
American film directors
American film editors
American male screenwriters
Full Sail University alumni
Horror film directors
Living people